Samuel John Wadsworth (13 September 1896 – 1 September 1961) was an English professional footballer who played as a left back for Darwen, Blackburn Rovers, Nelson, Huddersfield Town, Burnley and Lytham. He won 9 England caps between April 1922 and October 1926 and was captain for his final four appearances. He later had a long career in management in the Netherlands.

Personal life 
Wadsworth was born in Darwen, the son of Clara Ellen Briggs and James Wadsworth. He was married to Harriet Elizabeth Woodward. Prior to the outbreak of the First World War, Wadsworth worked as a clerk. he ran a garage while a Blackburn Rovers player and the business later failed, which caused financial and health problems for his family. After his retirement from professional football in 1930, Wadsworth worked for the Lytham St. Annes Corporation's transport department.

War service 
During the First World War, Wadsworth lied about his age to enlist as a gunner in the Royal Garrison Artillery and was wounded in action. His older brother Charles was killed in the war and "the atrocities left him physically and mentally scarred, suffering blackouts and grappling with post-traumatic stress".

Career statistics

Honours 
Huddersfield Town

 Football League First Division (3): 1923–24, 1924–25, 1925–26
 FA Cup (1): 1921–22
FA Charity Shield (1): 1922

Individual

 FA Charity Shield (2): 1923, 1924

References

External links 

1896 births
1961 deaths
English footballers
England international footballers
English football managers
Association football defenders
English Football League players
Blackburn Rovers F.C. players
Nelson F.C. players
Huddersfield Town A.F.C. players
Burnley F.C. players
DHC Delft managers
PSV Eindhoven managers
People from Darwen
Military personnel from Lancashire
English expatriate football managers
English Football League representative players
Lytham F.C. players
Darwen F.C. players
Expatriate football managers in the Netherlands
English expatriate sportspeople in the Netherlands
British Army personnel of World War I
Royal Garrison Artillery soldiers
People with post-traumatic stress disorder
FA Cup Final players